The 1990 National Soccer League season was the sixty-seventh season under the National Soccer League (NSL) name. The season concluded on September 12, 1990, with Toronto First Portuguese claiming their third NSL Championship by finishing first in the First Division. First Portuguese would also secure the NSL Canadian Championship by defeating St. Leonard of the Quebec National Soccer League on September 29, 1990, in Toronto, Ontario. The NSL Cup was won by St. Catharines Roma, and North York Strikers secured the Second Division championship.

Overview  
The league increased in membership and retained the majority of teams from the previous season. The league was structurally divided into two divisions the First and Second divisions. Potential plans for a promotion and relegation system were revealed. The First Division increased to nine members while the Second Division had seven clubs. The new entry to the First Division was former NSL franchise London City which acquired London Marconi's franchise rights. London City previously participated in the league until the 1983 season. Toronto Macedonia Stars was the lone departing club. 

In early May, league commissioner Rocco Lofranco announced the league's decision to begin discussions with the Canadian Soccer League (CSL) about a potential merger. The NSL continued to serve as a player conduit for the CSL player draft. Once the season concluded two new additions North York Strikers and Toronto International to the First Division were announced at the annual general meeting held in Toronto on December 2, 1990. Topics discussed at the general meeting were placing restrictions on any future expansion into the city of Toronto in the top division and continuing negotiations with the CSL.

Teams

Coaching changes

Final standings

Cup  
The cup tournament was a separate contest from the rest of the season, in which all sixteen teams took part. All the matches were separate from the regular season, and the teams were grouped into four separate divisions.  The NSL Cup was won by St. Catharines Roma.

Group A

Group B

Group C

Group D

NSL Canadian Championship 
Since the 1986 season, a joint effort was conducted between the Pacific Rim Soccer League of British Columbia, National Soccer League and the Quebec National Soccer League to provide a national champion. Their regional champions would face each other in a singles match for the championship. The Pacific Rim Soccer League participated in the first tournament but ceased operations in 1987. While their league cup champions would compete for the NSL Canada Cup.

Finals

References

External links
RSSSF CNSL page
thecnsl.com - 1990 season

 
1990 domestic association football leagues
National Soccer League
1990